Sun Shengwu (1917 – 9 June 2014), also known as Sun Wei, was a Chinese translator and editor.

Biography
Sun was born in Yanshi, Henan, China in 1917. In 1942 he graduated from Northwest University, where he majored in Russian language. In 1949 he joined the Time Publishing House as an editor. He was transferred to the People's Literature Publishing House in 1953, where he successively worked as Director of Foreign Editorial Office and Deputy Editor-In-Chief. He joined the Communist Party of China in 1960. He founded the Foreign Literature. He retired in April 1987. He died in Beijing on June 6, 2014. He was buried in Babaoshan Revolutionary Cemetery.

Works

References

External links
 新中国60年百名优秀出版人候选人：孙绳武 on Sina

1917 births
2014 deaths
People from Yanshi
Northwest University (China) alumni
Writers from Luoyang
Russian–Chinese translators
People's Republic of China translators
20th-century Chinese translators
21st-century Chinese translators